Varna is a hamlet (and census-designated place) located in Tompkins County, New York, United States.  It is within the Town of Dryden.

Varna is located near the west town line on New York State Route 366 (Dryden Road).  Fall Creek flows past the town to Cayuga Lake.

References

External links
 Varna Community Association
 Varna Volunteer Fire Company, Inc.

Hamlets in New York (state)
Hamlets in Tompkins County, New York